Marko Mert Matić (born 22 May 1995) is a Turkish volleyball player of Bosnian origin who plays for Halkbank (volleyball team) and the Turkish national team.

He participated in the 2017 Men's European Volleyball Championship and 2021 Men's European Volleyball Championship.

References

1995 births
Living people
Turkish men's volleyball players